Dark Streets of Cairo is a 1940 American mystery film directed by László Kardos and starring Sigrid Gurie, Ralph Byrd, Eddie Quillan, George Zucco and Katherine DeMille. The central plot of the film concerns " [A group of] jewel smugglers in Cairo [who] try to pin their crimes on a kidnapped baron".

Cast

 Sigrid Gurie as Ellen Stephens
 Ralph Byrd as Dennis Martin
 Eddie Quillan as Jerry Jones
 George Zucco as Abbadi
 Katherine DeMille as Shari Abbadi
 Rod La Rocque as Inspector Joachim
 Sig Arno as Khattab
 Yolande Donlan as Maggie Malone
 Lloyd Corrigan as Baron Stephens
 Henry Brandon as Hussien
 Nestor Paiva as Ahmend
 Dick Botiller as Nardo
 Steven Geray as Bellboy
 Wright Kramer as Professor Wyndham

References

External links

1940 films
American mystery films
Films set in Egypt
Universal Pictures films
1940 mystery films
American black-and-white films
1940s English-language films
Films directed by László Kardos
1940s American films